Debra A. Lamm is an American politician from the state of Montana. She is a former chair of the Montana Republican Party and a former member of the Montana House of Representatives.

Lamm defeated Reilly Neill in the 2014 elections, 2,030 votes to 1,894. She served for one term. Lamm was elected chair of the Montana Republican Party in 2017, and served in the role until 2019. She lost the nomination to Matt Rosendale.

References

External links

Living people
Republican Party members of the Montana House of Representatives
People from Livingston, Montana
State political party chairs of Montana
Women in Montana politics
Year of birth missing (living people)
21st-century American women